Raviv Chanan "Ricky" Ullman (born 24 January 1986) is an Israeli-American actor, director, and musician. He is best known for playing Phil Diffy, the main character in the Disney Channel series Phil of the Future.

Early life
Ullman was born in Eilat, Israel, to American Jewish parents Laura Ullman (née Ehrenkranz), a teacher, and Brian Ullman, a printer. He has a younger sister and younger brother named Tali and Nadav, respectively. After his first birthday, his family left their kibbutz in Israel for Norwalk, Connecticut, United States, and then to Fairfield, Connecticut the following year. When Ullman was younger, his father worked as a clown. While attending summer camp, he played Peter Pan, which helped him discover his talents in acting, singing, dancing, and reading drama novels.

Ullman was raised in the Conservative and Orthodox denominations of Judaism. His maternal grandfather, Joseph Ehrenkranz, was an Orthodox rabbi in Stamford, Connecticut. Ullman is a first cousin, twice removed, of former Connecticut Senator Joe Lieberman. Lieberman's mother and Ullman's matrilineal great-grandmother were sisters.

Ullman taught himself how to play the trombone. Ullman was selected to attend the Hugh O'Brian Youth Leadership Foundation (HOBY) youth leadership program of Connecticut in March 2002 where he was selected as the "outstanding ambassador" enabling him to attend the HOBY World Leadership Congress in the summer of 2002. He went to Hillel Academy and is a graduate of Fairfield Warde High School. He was active in National Conference of Synagogue Youth.

Career

Early Career: 1997–2003
Ullman's first professional role was as Louis in the national touring company of The King and I along with Jesse McCartney. Other productions he worked on include Peter Pan at the Polka Dot Playhouse, The Music Man with the New England Repertory Company, and Just People at the Long Wharf Theatre. He received a 1998–1999 Best Actor nomination from the Connecticut Critics' Awards for his character Stanley in Stamford Theater Work's A Rosen by Any Other Name. He had small roles in film and television shows, notably portraying Christopher Knight in the 2000 movie Growing Up Brady.

Prominence in television: 2004–2009

Phil of the Future and Disney 
Ullman is best known for his starring role as Phil Diffy, a teen from the year 2121 on Disney Channel's Phil of the Future, a series that debuted June 2004. He also starred as Roscoe in Disney's made-for-television film Pixel Perfect. During this period, Ullman appeared in other Disney Channel programming, such as a guest role on That's So Raven, and was an identified member of the Disney Channel Circle of Stars, appearing with other members of the Circle in the music video for "A Dream is a Wish Your Heart Makes," where he sang as well as played the drums.

Rita Rocks and other television and film 
In 2004, Ullman starred as Sam in ABC Family's television film Searching for David's Heart. He appeared in a string of independent films including The Big Bad Swim and Driftwood (2006), Normal Adolescent Behavior (2007), and Prom Wars (2008). During this period, he guest-starred in TV shows like Big Love and Law & Order: Special Victims Unit.

Ullman was cast as Kip in the Lifetime sitcom Rita Rocks, which premiered in 2009. His character was the drummer in the titular character's band and her daughter's boyfriend. The show was canceled after two seasons.

While Ullman previously went by the stage name Ricky, he started using his real name in 2006 when he guest-starred on an episode of House and continued to use Raviv on all projects since.

Music 
In June 2006, Ullman and a few of his friends created parody hip-hop music videos under the name the Webee Boys. In December 2006, Ullman met actor Douglas Smith of Big Love fame and together they formed a band called Goodbye Ian. The group expanded to as many as seven people and later changed its name to His Orchestra. Ullman plays drums and glockenspiel in the band, which released its debut album, Field Guide to the Wilds, on 24 February 2009.

Post-television career: 2009–Present

Theater 
After completing Rita Rocks in 2009, Ullman had some small roles in short films, television, and film but began to focus his career on theater acting, starring in Off-Broadway and regional theater productions.

From January 2012 to 24 March 2012, Ullman starred as the character Alex in the New Group's production of Russian Transport Off-Broadway in New York. On 30 April 2012, it was announced that Ullman joined the cast of Alena Smith's new Off-Broadway play The Bad Guys. It began performances on 22 May at the McGinn/Cazale Theater on the Upper West Side in New York City. In 2014, Ullman acted opposite of Holly Hunter and Richard Chamberlain in the first revival of Sticks and Bones. Sticks and Bones opened 6 November 2014 and closed 14 December 2014.

Ullman starred in the 2017 benefit play Right Before I Go at The Town Hall.

In 2018, Ullman performed in the Roundabout Theatre Company Underground's much-lauded production of Usual Girls by Ming Peiffer.

Music 
Ullman is an accomplished musician and plays drums and guitar. He has worked as a touring musician, notably with Soko on her 2012 tour. Ullman was a member of the band Reputante, which released their 2013 debut on Julian Casablancas' record label Cult Records. He departed the band sometime in 2015. With Reputante members James Levy and Jimmy Giannopoulos, Ullman helped form the band Lolawolf with actress Zoë Kravitz. They released their self-titled debut EP on 4 February 2014. He left Lolawolf before the release of their first full-length record, Calm Down, in October 2014.

Filmmaking 
In October 2016, Ullman announced his project Standing Ground, a documentary that explores the Standing Rock Sioux Nation, the North Dakota Access Pipeline and the fossil fuels industry. Production of the film took place throughout 2017.

Ullman also directs music videos.

Podcasting 
Ullman, along with Rabbi Adam Greenwald, hosts The Study, a podcast focused on exploring, questioning, and applying the Torah. The trailer was released in late September 2020, and the first episode came out on 2 October 2020.

Personal life
Ullman speaks fluent Hebrew and keeps a kosher kitchen. Ullman is an environmentalist and has called himself "a fourth generation activist". He works with TAP (Teens AIDS Prevention).

Ullman lived in Brooklyn, New York until 2020, then he moved to Los Angeles, California.

Filmography

Films

Television

Stage

References

External links
 

1986 births
Living people
American male child actors
American drummers
American male stage actors
American male television actors
Israeli emigrants to the United States
Jewish Israeli male actors
Israeli people of American descent
Jewish American male actors
Actors from Fairfield, Connecticut
People from Eilat
20th-century American male actors
21st-century American male actors
21st-century American drummers
21st-century American Jews